The 2022 Gijón Open is a professional men's tennis tournament to be played on indoor hard courts. It will be the 1st edition of the event, and part of the ATP World Tour 250 series of the 2022 ATP Tour. It will be played at Palacio de Deportes in Gijón, Spain, from 10 to 16 October 2022.

The event was one of the six tournaments that were given single-year ATP 250 licenses in September and October 2022 due to the cancellation of tournaments in China because of the ongoing COVID-19 pandemic.

Champions

Singles 

  Andrey Rublev def.  Sebastian Korda 6–2, 6–3

Doubles 

  Máximo González /  Andrés Molteni def.  Nathaniel Lammons /  Jackson Withrow 6–7(6–8), 7–6(7–4), [10–5]

Singles main-draw entrants

Seeds 

† Rankings are as of 3 October 2022.

Other entrants 
The following players received wildcards into the main draw:
  Martín Landaluce
  Feliciano López
  Andy Murray

The following player was accepted directly into the main draw using a protected ranking:
  Dominic Thiem

The following players received entry from the qualifying draw:
  Nicolás Álvarez Varona
  Manuel Guinard
  Marco Trungelliti
  Alexey Vatutin

The following player received entry as a lucky loser:
  Carlos Taberner

Withdrawals 
  Adrian Mannarino → replaced by  Carlos Taberner

Doubles main-draw entrants

Seeds 

 1 Rankings as of 3 October 2022.

Other entrants 
The following pairs received wildcards into the doubles main draw:
  Alejandro Davidovich Fokina /  Martín Landaluce
  Sergio Martos Gornés /  Jaume Munar

The following pair received entry as alternates:
  Sander Arends /  David Pel

Withdrawals 
  William Blumberg /  Tommy Paul → replaced by  Diego Hidalgo /  Cristian Rodríguez 
  Rohan Bopanna /  Matwé Middelkoop → replaced by  Marcos Giron /  Hunter Reese
  Adrian Mannarino /  Fabrice Martin → replaced by  Sander Gillé /  Fabrice Martin
  Hugo Nys /  Jan Zieliński → replaced by  Nikola Ćaćić /  Hugo Nys
  Albert Ramos Viñolas /  Bernabé Zapata Miralles → replaced by  Sander Arends /  David Pel

References

External links 
 Official website
 ATP tournament profile

Gijon Open
Gijon Open
Gijon Open
Gijón Open